Ormayude Arakal (The Cells of Memory) is a collection of memoirs by Vaikom Muhammad Basheer originally serialised in Chandrika Weekly and published as a book by National Book Stall in 1973. It is a rambling, incomplete kind of autobiography by the noted Malayalam author. The book also includes Basheer's conversations with Sreedharan, B. M. Gafoor, P. K. Muhammad, M. A. Hakim, K. K. Amu, I. V. Sasi, and Punalur Rajan.

References

1973 non-fiction books
Indian autobiographies
Books by Vaikom Muhammad Basheer
Literary memoirs
Literary autobiographies
Malayalam-language books
Works originally published in Indian newspapers